Kornelia Lesiewicz (born 14 August 2003) is a Polish athlete sprinter who specializes in the 400 metres. At the age of less than 18, she won a gold medal in the event at the 2021 European Under 20 Championships. The same year, Lesiewicz finished second at the World U20 Championships.

Career
At the age of 15, Kornelia Lesiewicz finished sixth in the 400 metres at the 2019 European Youth Olympic Festival held in Baku, Azerbaijan.

In August 2020, she broke the 46-year-old national under-18 best in the 400 m in a time of 52.86 seconds at the Irena Szewińska Memorial in Bydgoszcz, Poland. In September, Lesiewicz bettered her own record clocking 52.73 s to win the Polish U18 Championships.

In 2021, the 17-year-old was a part of national 4×400 m relay team, winning a bronze medal at the European Indoor Championships – where she was the youngest athlete to win a medal, a silver at the World Relays, and a gold at the European Team Championships Super League. On 16 July, competing against sprinters up to two years her senior, Lesiewicz won a gold medal in the individual event at the European U20 Championships with a time of 52.46 s. She improved by almost half a second to take a silver at the World U20 Championships held in Nairobi, Kenya, finishing behind only Nigeria's Imaobong Nse Uko.

Achievements

References

External links
 

2003 births
Living people
Polish female sprinters
Place of birth missing (living people)
21st-century Polish women